The Rivers State Ministry of Chieftaincy and Community Affairs is the government ministry that administers issues related to chieftaincy and community in Rivers State, Nigeria. The ministry has its headquarters at 11th floor, State Secretariat, Port Harcourt. Incumbent commissioner is Sylvanus Nwankwo.

List of commissioners
Charles Okaye
John Bazia
Sylvanus Nwankwo

See also
List of government ministries of Rivers State

References

Chieftaincy and Community Affairs